(−)-Stepholidine is a protoberberine alkaloid found in the plant Stephania intermedia.

Stepholidine activity includes dual D2 receptor antagonist and D1 receptor agonist, and has shown antipsychotic activity in animal studies.

See also

References

D1-receptor agonists
D2 antagonists
Benzylisoquinoline alkaloids
Phenols
Phenol ethers